Operation Downfall was the proposed Allied plan for the invasion of the Japanese home islands near the end of World War II. 

The operation had two parts, Operation Olympic, intended to capture the southern third of the southernmost main Japanese island, Kyūshū, and Operation Coronet, the planned invasion of the Kantō Plain, near Tokyo, on the main Japanese island of Honshu. Olympic was scheduled for November 1945, to be followed by Coronet in early 1946. 

If Downfall had taken place, it would have been the largest amphibious operation in history, surpassing D-Day. The planned operation was canceled when Japan surrendered following the atomic bombings of Hiroshima and Nagasaki, the Soviet declaration of war, and the invasion of Manchuria.

Order of Battle for Olympic

Allied 

Supreme Commander, Allied Forces Pacific
General Douglas MacArthur

Ground forces 

Should these four corps prove insufficient to accomplish the tasks assigned, elements earmarked for Coronet would be used to reinforce Sixth Army at the rate of three divisions per month beginning about 30 days after the initial landings.

  Sixth Army
 General Walter Krueger
 Peripheral landings
  40th Infantry "Sunburst" Division (Landing on Yakushima and Koshikijima Islands)
  158th Infantry Regiment (Landing on Tanegashima)
  I Corps (Landing at Miyazaki)
 Major General Innis P. Swift
  25th Infantry "Tropic Lightning" Division
  33rd Infantry "Illinois" Division
  41st Infantry "Sunsetters" Division
  V Amphibious Corps (Landing at Kushikino)
 Major General Harry Schmidt, USMC
  3rd Marine Division (Bougainville, Guam, Iwo Jima)
  4th Marine Division (Kwajalein, Saipan/Tinian, Iwo Jima)
  5th Marine Division (Iwo Jima)
  XI Corps (Landing at Ariake)
 Major General Charles P. Hall
  1st Cavalry Division
  Americal Division
  43rd Infantry "Winged Victory" Division
  IX Corps (Reserve afloat)
 Major General Charles W. Ryder
  81st Infantry "Wildcat" Division
  98th Infantry "Iroquois" Division
 Follow-up units:
  11th Airborne Division
  77th Infantry Division

Naval forces 

 Third Fleet
 Admiral William F. Halsey
 20 fleet and light aircraft carriers
   9 battleships
 26 cruisers
 75 destroyers
 incl. British Pacific Fleet
 6 fleet and light carriers
 Fifth Fleet
 Admiral Raymond A. Spruance
   36 escort carriers
   11 battleships
   26 cruisers
 387 destroyers and destroyer escorts
 394 AKA, AP, APA, APD, APH
 977 LSD, LSM, LST, and LSV
 Seventh Fleet
 Admiral Thomas C. Kinkaid

Air forces 

 Far East Air Forces
 General George C. Kenney (119,000 men) – 14 bomber groups, 10 fighter groups
 Fifth Air Force
 Seventh Air Force
 Thirteenth Air Force
 United States Strategic Air Forces in the Pacific
 General Carl A. Spaatz
 Major General Curtis E. LeMay
 Twentieth Air Force (Lt. Gen. Nathan Twining) (77,000 men)
 1,000 B-29 Superfortresses
 Eighth Air Force (Lt. Gen. Jimmy Doolittle)
 Commonwealth forces
 Tiger Force (detached from RAF Bomber Command):
 480–580 Avro Lancaster bombers (about half to be used as tankers for in-flight refuelling)
 Australian First Tactical Air Force
 20 fighter/attack squadrons from the Royal Australian Air Force

Japan

Ground forces 

 Second General Army
 Field Marshal Shunroku Hata
 Sixteenth Area Army
 Lieut. General Yokoyama Isamu (600,000 men)
 Northern Kyūshū — 56th Army
 Lieut. General Ichiro Shichida (365,000)
 145th Division
 312th Division
 351st Division
 124th Independent Mixed Brigade
 57th Division (20,000 men)
 4th Tank Brigade
 Southeastern Kyūshū — 57th Army
 Lieut. General Nishihara Kanji (150,000 men)
 Tanegashima—109th Independent Mixed Brigade (5,900 men)
 Miyazaki—154th Division, 156th Division, 212th Division (55,000 men)
 Ariake—86th Division, 98th Independent Mixed Brigade, 1 regiment, 3 infantry battalions (29,000 men)
 25th Division, 5th Tank Brigade, 6th Tank Brigade
 Southwestern Kyūshū — 40th Army
 Lieut. General Nakazawa Mitsuo (85,000 men)
 303rd Division (12,000 men) (Sendai)
 206th Division (Fukiage)
 146th Division, 125th Independent Mixed Brigade (S. Satsuma Peninsula)
 77th Division 1 tank regiment
 216th Division 4 brigades

Air forces 
 Air General Army
 General Masakazu Kawabe
 Sixth Air Army — Kyūshū
 5,000 aircraft assigned as kamikazes, 5,000 aircraft available for kamikaze service, 7,000 aircraft in need of repair
 100 Koryu-class midget submarines, 250 Kairyu-class midget submarines, 1,000 Kaiten manned torpedoes, 800 Shinyo suicide boats

Order of Battle for Coronet

Allied

Ground forces 

  First Army
 General Courtney H. Hodges
  III Amphibious Corps
  1st Marine Division (Guadalcanal, Peleliu, Okinawa)
  2nd Marine Division (Tarawa, Saipan, Okinawa)
  6th Marine Division (Okinawa)
  XXIV Corps
  7th Infantry "Bayonet" Division
  27th Infantry "New York" Division
  96th Infantry "Columbia" Division
  Eighth Army
 Lieut. General Robert L. Eichelberger
  X Corps
  24th Infantry "Taro" Division
  31st Infantry "Dixie" Division
  37th Infantry "Buckeye" Division
  XIV Corps
  6th Infantry "Red Star" Division
  32nd Infantry "Red Arrow" Division
  38th Infantry "Cyclone" Division
  XIII Corps (Reserve afloat)
  13th Armored Division
  20th Armored Division
 United States Army Forces Pacific reserve
  97th Infantry "Trident" Division

Thirty days after the initial assault, each army would be reinforced by a corps of 3 divisions. Five days later an airborne division and a United States Army Forces Pacific Reserve Corps of 3 divisions would be made available. Strategic reserve for the entire operation would consist of a corps of 3 divisions located in the Philippines and divisions from the United States to permit reinforcement at the rate of 4 per month.

Unsourced listing of the aforementioned reinforcements
 For First Army
 Unnamed follow-on corps
  5th Infantry Division
  44th Infantry Division
  86th Infantry Division
 For Eighth Army
 Unnamed follow-on corps
  4th Infantry Division
  8th Infantry Division
  87th Infantry Division
 United States Army Forces Pacific reserve
  11th Airborne Division
 Unnamed follow-on corps
  2nd Infantry Division
  28th Infantry Division
  35th Infantry Division
 Strategic reserve
  91st Infantry Division
  95th Infantry Division
  104th Infantry Division
 British Commonwealth Ground Forces
 Commonwealth Corps (Lt. Gen. Charles Keightley)
  3rd Infantry Division (United Kingdom)
  6th Infantry Division (Canada)
  10th Infantry Division (Australia)

Japan 

All Japanese formations on Honshu were badly understrength and lacking in equipment. The American First Army's landings would likely have been opposed by the Japanese 52nd Army and the Eighth Army's landings by the Japanese 53rd Army.
 First General Army
 Field Marshal Hajime Sugiyama
 Twelfth Area Army
 General Shizuichi Tanaka
 36th Army – Urawa, Saitama
 81st Division
 93rd Division
 201st Division
 202nd Division
 206th Division
 214th Division
 1st Tank Division
 4th Tank Division
 51st Army – Tsuchiura, Ibaraki
 44th Division – Ogawa
 151st Division – Mito
 221st Division – Kashima
 115th Independent Mixed Brigade – Shibasaki
 116th Independent Mixed Brigade – Hokota
 7th Independent Armored Brigade – Ogawa
 52nd Army – Sakura, Chiba
 3rd Imperial Guards Division – Naruto
 147th Division – Mobara
 152nd Division – Choshi
 234th Division – Sōsa
 3rd Independent Armored Brigade
 8th Artillery Headquarters
 53rd Army – Isehara, Kanagawa
 84th Division – Odarawa
 140th Division – Kamakura
 316th Division – Isehara
 117th Independent Mixed Brigade – Numazu
 2nd Independent Armored Brigade – Tsudanuma
 11th Artillery Headquarters – Hiratsuka
 Tokyo Bay Garrison – Choshi, Chiba
 321st Division – Tokyoa

Notes

References

Downfall